Bagalwad also spelled as Bagalawada is a village near Kavital in the Manvi taluk of Raichur district in the Indian state of Karnataka. It is located in the Manvi taluk of Raichur district in Karnataka.

Demographics
 India census, Bagalwad had a population of 7543 with 3777 males and 3766 females.

See also
 Maski
 Watgal
 Kavital
 Manvi
 Raichur

References

External links
www.raichur.nic.in

Villages in Raichur district